The Foundation of SAARC Writers and Literature (FOSWAL) is the only SAARC apex body in the SAARC region, working under the SAARC banner, projecting, nurturing and strengthening cultural connectivity through literary and cultural interactions among the SAARC countries, for peace and tranquility in the region, through people-to-people contacts and dialogue.

History

FOSWAL launched its vision of cultural bonding among the neighboring SAARC countries in 1987, and emerged as the first and the only non government organization working in the specific area of culture, for creating cultural connectivity through a think tank of intellectuals and writers, creative fraternity and peace activities, who have common sensitivities and common concerns for the socio-cultural-political-economic-tribal-gender issues of the region.

FOSWAL organises variety of art, literature and culture related festivals ensuring participations of eminent writers and scholars from across South Asian region.

References

External links

Writers and Literature